Copper(II) chloride is the chemical compound with the chemical formula CuCl2. The anhydrous form is pinkish brown but slowly absorbs moisture to form a Black-green dihydrate.

Both the anhydrous and the dihydrate forms occur naturally as the very rare minerals tolbachite and eriochalcite, respectively.<ref name="xray18">Marlene C. Morris, Howard F. McMurdie, Eloise H. Evans, Boris Paretzkin, Harry S. Parker, and Nicolas C. Panagiotopoulos (1981) Copper chloride hydrate (eriochalcite), in Standard X-ray Diffraction Powder Patterns National Bureau of Standards, Monograph 25, Section 18; page 33.</ref>

Structure
Anhydrous CuCl2 adopts a distorted cadmium iodide structure. In this motif, the copper centers are octahedral.  Most copper(II) compounds exhibit distortions from idealized octahedral geometry due to the Jahn-Teller effect, which in this case describes the localization of one d-electron into a molecular orbital that is strongly antibonding with respect to a pair of chloride ligands. In CuCl2·2H2O, the copper again adopts a highly distorted octahedral geometry, the Cu(II) centers being surrounded by two water ligands and four chloride ligands, which bridge asymmetrically to other Cu centers.

Copper(II) chloride is paramagnetic.  Of historical interest, CuCl2·2H2O was used in the first electron paramagnetic resonance measurements by Yevgeny Zavoisky in 1944.

Properties and reactions

Aqueous solutions prepared from copper(II) chloride contain a range of copper(II) complexes depending on concentration, temperature, and the presence of additional chloride ions. These species include blue color of [Cu(H2O)6]2+ and yellow or red color of the halide complexes of the formula [CuCl2+x]x−.

Hydrolysis
Copper(II) hydroxide precipitates upon treating copper(II) chloride solutions with base:
CuCl2 + 2 NaOH   →   Cu(OH)2  +  2 NaCl

Partial hydrolysis gives dicopper chloride trihydroxide, Cu2(OH)3Cl, a popular fungicide.

Redox
Copper(II) chloride is a mild oxidant. It decomposes to copper(I) chloride and chlorine gas near 1000 °C:
2 CuCl2 → 2 CuCl + Cl2
Copper(II) chloride (CuCl2) reacts with several metals to produce copper metal or copper(I) chloride (CuCl) with oxidation of the other metal. To convert copper(II) chloride to copper(I) chloride, it can be convenient to reduce an aqueous solution with sulfur dioxide as the reductant:
2 CuCl2  + SO2 + 2 H2O → 2 CuCl + 2 HCl  + H2SO4

Coordination complexes
CuCl2 reacts with HCl or other chloride sources to form complex ions: the red CuCl3− (it is a dimer in reality, Cu2Cl62−, a couple of tetrahedrons that share an edge), and the green or yellow CuCl42−.

 +     
 + 2    

Some of these complexes can be crystallized from aqueous solution, and they adopt a wide variety of structures.

Copper(II) chloride also forms a variety of coordination complexes with ligands such as ammonia, pyridine and triphenylphosphine oxide:
CuCl2 + 2 C5H5N → [CuCl2(C5H5N)2] (tetragonal)
CuCl2 + 2 (C6H5)3PO → [CuCl2((C6H5)3PO)2] (tetrahedral)
However "soft" ligands such as phosphines (e.g., triphenylphosphine), iodide, and cyanide as well as some tertiary amines induce reduction to give copper(I) complexes.

Preparation
Copper(II) chloride is prepared commercially by the action of chlorination of copper. Copper at red heat (300-400°C) combines directly with chlorine gas, giving (molten) copper (II) chloride. The reaction is very exothermic.
 Cu(s) + Cl2(g)   →   CuCl2(l)
It is also commercially practical to combine copper(II) oxide with an excess of ammonium chloride at similar temperatures, producing copper chloride, ammonia, and water:
 CuO + 2NH4Cl → CuCl2 + 2NH3 + H2O

Although copper metal itself cannot be oxidised by hydrochloric acid, copper-containing bases such as the hydroxide, oxide, or copper(II) carbonate can react to form CuCl2 in an acid-base reaction.

Once prepared, a solution of CuCl2 may be purified by crystallization. A standard method takes the solution mixed in hot dilute hydrochloric acid, and causes the crystals to form by cooling in a Calcium chloride (CaCl2)-ice bath.

There are indirect and rarely used means of using copper ions in solution to form copper(II) chloride. Electrolysis of aqueous sodium chloride with copper electrodes produces (among other things) a blue-green foam that can be collected and converted to the hydrate. While this is not usually done due to the emission of toxic chlorine gas, and the prevalence of the more general chloralkali process, the electrolysis will convert the copper metal to copper ions in solution forming the compound. Indeed, any solution of copper ions can be mixed with hydrochloric acid and made into a copper chloride by removing any other ions.

Natural occurrence
Copper(II) chloride occurs naturally as the very rare anhydrous mineral tolbachite and the dihydrate eriochalcite. Both are found near fumaroles and in some Cu mines. More common are mixed oxyhydroxide-chlorides like atacamite Cu2(OH)3Cl, arising among Cu ore beds oxidation zones in arid climate (also known from some altered slags).

Uses

 In organic synthesis 

 Co-catalyst in Wacker process 
A major industrial application for copper(II) chloride is as a co-catalyst with palladium(II) chloride in the Wacker process. In this process, ethene (ethylene) is converted to ethanal (acetaldehyde) using water and air. During the reaction, PdCl2 is reduced to Pd, and the CuCl2 serves to re-oxidize this back to PdCl2. Air can then oxidize the resultant CuCl back to CuCl2, completing the cycle.

 C2H4 + PdCl2  + H2O  → CH3CHO  + Pd + 2 HCl
 Pd + 2 CuCl2  → 2 CuCl + PdCl2
 4 CuCl + 4 HCl + O2 → 4 CuCl2 + 2 H2O

The overall process is:
2 C2H4 + O2 → 2 CH3CHO

 Other organic synthetic applications 
Copper(II) chloride has some highly specialized applications in the synthesis of organic compounds. It affects chlorination of aromatic hydrocarbons—this is often performed in the presence of aluminium oxide. It is able to chlorinate the alpha position of carbonyl compounds:

This reaction is performed in a polar solvent such as dimethylformamide (DMF), often in the presence of lithium chloride, which accelerates the reaction.

CuCl2, in the presence of oxygen, can also oxidize phenols. The major product can be directed to give either a quinone or a coupled product from oxidative dimerization. The latter process provides a high-yield route to 1,1-binaphthol:

Such compounds are intermediates in the synthesis of BINAP and its derivatives.

Copper(II) chloride dihydrate promotes the hydrolysis of acetonides, i.e., for deprotection to regenerate diols or aminoalcohols, as in this example (where TBDPS = tert-butyldiphenylsilyl):

CuCl2 also catalyses the free radical addition of sulfonyl chlorides to alkenes; the alpha-chlorosulfone may then undergo elimination with base to give a vinyl sulfone product.

 In inorganic synthesis 

 Catalyst in production of chlorine 
Copper(II) chloride is used as a catalyst in a variety of processes that produce chlorine by oxychlorination. The Deacon process takes place at about 400 to 450 °C in the presence of a copper chloride:
4 HCl + O2 → 2 Cl2 + 2 H2O

Copper(II) chloride catalyzes the chlorination in the production of  vinyl chloride and dichloroethane.

Copper(II) chloride is used in the Copper–chlorine cycle in which it splits steam into a copper oxygen compound and hydrogen chloride, and is later recovered in the cycle from the electrolysis of copper(I) chloride.

Niche uses
Copper(II) chloride is also used in pyrotechnics as a blue/green coloring agent.   In a flame test, copper chlorides, like all copper compounds, emit green-blue.

In humidity indicator cards (HICs), cobalt-free brown to azure (copper(II) chloride base) HICs can be found on the market. In 1998, the European Community (EC) classified items containing cobalt(II) chloride of 0.01 to 1% w/w as T (Toxic), with the corresponding R phrase of R49 (may cause cancer if inhaled). As a consequence, new cobalt-free humidity indicator cards have been developed that contain copper.

Safety

Copper(II) chloride can be toxic.  Only concentrations below five ppm are allowed in drinking water by the US Environmental Protection Agency.

Copper (II) chloride has been demonstrated to cause chromosomal aberrations and mitotic cycle disturbances within A. cepa cells. Such cellular disturbances lead to genotoxicity. Copper (II) chloride has also been studied as a harmful environmental pollutant. Often present in irrigation-grade water, copper (ii) chloride can negatively affect water and soil microbes. Specifically, denitrifying bacteria were found to be very sensitive to the presence of copper(ii) chloride. At a concentration of 0.95 mg L−1, copper(II) chloride was found to cause a 50% inhibition (IC50) of the metabolic activity of denitrifying microbes.

References

Further reading
 
 
 The Merck Index, 7th edition, Merck & Co, Rahway, New Jersey, USA, 1960.
 D. Nicholls, Complexes and First-Row Transition Elements, Macmillan Press, London, 1973.
 A. F. Wells, '''Structural Inorganic Chemistry, 5th ed., Oxford University Press, Oxford, UK, 1984.
 J. March, Advanced Organic Chemistry, 4th ed., p. 723, Wiley, New York, 1992.
 Fieser & Fieser Reagents for Organic Synthesis Volume 5, p158, Wiley, New York, 1975.

External links

 Copper Chloride at The Periodic Table of Videos (University of Nottingham)
 Copper (II) Chloride – Description and Pictures
 National Pollutant Inventory – Copper and compounds fact sheet

Copper(II) compounds
Chlorides
Metal halides
Semiconductor materials
Coordination complexes
Pyrotechnic colorants